Kalgah-e Olya (also Romanized as Kalgāh-e ‘Olyā; also known as Gol Gāh, Gol Kāh-e Bālā, Kalgāh, and Kalgāh-e Bālā) is a village in Bakesh-e Do Rural District, in the Central District of Mamasani County, Fars Province, Iran. At the 2006 census, its population was 434, in 87 families.

References 

Populated places in Mamasani County